These are lists of prominent Italo-Albanians, arranged by field of activity.

History and politics 
 Francesco Crispi  –  Italy's Prime Minister from 1887 until 1891, among the main protagonists of the Italian Risorgimento.
 Giorgio Basta  –  General of Holy Roman Empire
 Antonio Gramsci  –  Philosopher, writer, politician and political theorist – founding member and leader of the Communist Party of Italy
 Juan Pedro Aladro Kastriota –  Spanish-Arbereshe nobleman, diplomat, and pretender of the throne of Albania
 Giuseppe Salvatore Bellusci  –  politician.
 Nicola Barbato  –  Doctor and politician, among the founders of the movement of the Fasci Siciliani Workers.
 Giacomo Vuxani  –  Italian politician
 Joseph J. DioGuardi  –  Former US Congressman.
 Stefano Rodotà  –  Italian Politician.
 Antonio Rodotà  –  Director General of the European Space Agency (ESA), serving from 1997 until 2003
 Victor Hugo Schiro  –  Two-term mayor (17 July 1961 – 2 May 1970) of New Orleans, Louisiana
 Terenzio Tocci  –  Politician
 Sal Albanese  –  Politician
 Richard Caliguiri – politician

Business
 Enrico Cuccia –  Banker, founder of Mediobanca and important figure in Italian post-war industrial reconstruction 
 Nicolas Berggruen –  Philanthropist and investor
 Anselmo Lorecchio –  Italian lawyer, journalist, politician, poet and writer
 Ercole Lupinacci –  Bishop of the Italo-Albanian Church of Eparchy of Lungro.
 Ofelia Giudicissi Curci –  Italian poet and archeologist
 Bernardino Vitali - printer

Academics
 Girolamo de Rada  –  Author and important figure of the Albanian National Awakening
 Giulio Variboba  –  Poet
 Giuseppe Serembe  –  Lyric poet.
 Carmine Abate  –  Novelist and short story writer.
 Domenico Bellizzi a.k.a. Vorea Ujko  –  Priest and poet
 Mario Bellizzi  –  Poet
 Bernardo Bilotta  –  Priest, poet and folklorist
 Demetrio Camarda  –  Byzantine rite priest, Albanian language scholar, historian and philologist
 Nicola Chetta  –  Byzantine rite priest, ethnographic, writer and poet
 Giuseppe Crispi  –  Priest and philologist, one of the major figures of the Arbëresh community of Sicily of his time.
 Giuseppe Schirò  –  Poet, linguist, publicist, folklorist and Albanian patriot, among the most representative figures of the Arbëreshë literature of the 19th century
 Ernest Koliqi –  Writer, poet, playwright and university teacher in Rome.
 Gabriele Dara   –  Politician and poet, regarded as one of the early writers of the Albanian National Awakening.
 Ernesto Sabato  –  Argentine painter, physicist, and influential writer of Arbëreshë and Italian ethnicity
 Giuseppe Schirò Di Maggio  –  Poet, journalist, essayist, playwright and writer, among the most influential and prolific exponents of contemporary Arbëreshë literature
 Eleuterio Francesco Fortino  –  Priest of the Italo-Albanian Church in Calabria and writer of the Bizantine and Albanian culture
 Angelo Masci  –  Writer
 Luca Matranga  –  Byzantine rite priest, one of the first writers in Albanian
 Francesco Antonio Santori  –  Writer, playwright and poet of the Albanian National Awakening
 Laura Mersini-Houghton  –  American cosmologist
 Ferruccio Baffa Trasci  –  Bishop, theologian and philosopher
 Tom Perrotta  –  American novelist and screenwriter
 Marco La Piana  –  Italian scholar of Arbëresh origin
 Maria Antonia Braile  –  Italian-arbëreshë writer and the first Albanian woman writer to ever publish literature in Albanian
 Francesco Altimari  –  Italian scholar in the field of Albanology
 Pasquale Scutari  –  Italian linguist and Albanologist
 Giuseppe Schirò (junior)  –  Italian scholar and literary historian

Military 
 Mercurio Bua  –   Famed condottiero (stratioti captain) and commander of the Venetian army
 Hadji Alia  –    Albanian pirate lord
 Theodore Bua  –   Albanian captain of stradioti regiments of the Republic of Venice
 Demetrio Reres  –   Calabrian nobleman
 Graitzas Palaiologos  –   Commander of the Byzantine garrison
 Gjon Markagjoni  –   Albanian Catholic clan chieftain
 Khoja Zufar  –   Captain, governor, merchant and General
 Demetrio Capuzzimati  –   Stradiot captain in Puglia

Religious 
 Pope Clement XI  –  Pope from 23 November 1700 to his death in 1721. part from the noble Albani family which had established itself in Urbino from northern Albania in the 15th century.
 Sotir Ferrara  –  Bishop of the Italo-Albanian Church of Eparchy of Piana degli Albanesi
 Donato Oliverio  –  Bishop of the Eparchy of Lungro, a diocese of the Italo-Albanian Catholic Church in Calabria, Italy
 Giorgio Demetrio Gallaro  –  Bishop of the Eparchy of Piana degli Albanesi, a diocese of the Italo-Albanian Catholic Church in Sicily, Italy
 Nikollë Filja  –  Arbëreshë Byzantine rite priest, and writer of the 18th century
 Antonio Ciliberti  –  Roman Catholic archbishop
 Alessandro Albani  –  Prominent jurist and papal administrator
 Annibale Albani  –  Italian Cardinal
 Ernest Simoni  –  Cardinal
 Gian Girolamo Albani  –  Italian Roman Catholic cardinal
 Gian Francesco Albani  –  Roman Catholic Cardinal
 Giuseppe Albani  –  Italian Roman Catholic Cardinal
 Ferruccio Baffa Trasci  –  Italian bishop, theologian and philosopher
 Eleuterio Francesco Fortino  –  Italian priest of the Italo-Albanian Catholic Church
 Pietro Parente  –  Long-serving theologian in the Holy Office of the Roman Catholic Church
 Raffaele Castielli  –  Italian bishop
 Arberia Parish  –  Eastern Orthodox Christian parish

Artists 
 Marco Basaiti  –  Renaissance painter
 Francesco Albani-Baroque Painter from the 17th century
 Giovanni Paisiello  –  Italian composer of the Classical era, and was the most popular opera composer of the late 1700s
 Michele Greco da Valona - Albanian painter of the Adriatic Renaissance
 Nik Spatari  –  Italian painter, sculptor, architect and art scholar
 Ibrahim Kodra – Painter
 Alborosie - Italian Reggae Ambassador
 Xhovalin Delia - Painter, publicist and film director

Arts and entertainment 
 Tito Schipa  –  Italian tenor
 Nik Spatari  –  Italian painter, sculptor, architect and art scholar
 Salvatore Frega -  Italian composer of contemporary cultured music and experimental music
 Anna Oxa – Italian-Albanian singer, actress and television presenter
 Ermal Meta  – Italian-Albanian singer
 Elhaida Dani  – Italian-Albanian singer

Sportspeople 
Giovanni Paramithiotti - founder and first Chairman of FC Inter Milan 
Igli Tare   –  Football player
Emanuele Ndoj  –  Albanian professional footballer
Giacomo Vrioni  –  Italian-Albanian football player
Andrea Isufaj   –  Italian football player
Marash Kumbulla  –  Italian-born Albanian professional footballer
Irlian Ceka  –  Albanian professional footballer
Kastriot Dermaku  –  Albanian professional footballer
Entonjo Elezaj  –  Italian-Albanian football player
Ador Gjuci  –  Italian-Albanian football player
Alessio Hyseni  –  Italian-Albanian football player
 Antonio Candreva  –  Italian footballer
 Ardit Gashi  –  Italian-Kosovar footballer
 Giuseppe Bellusci  –  Italian footballer
 Luca Rizzo  –  Italian professional footballer who plays for Serie A club Bologna.
 Daniel Caligiuri  –  German professional footballer who plays as a midfielder for Schalke 04 in the Bundesliga.
 Marco Caligiuri  –  German footballer
 Stefano Fiore  –  Italian football manager and former player, who played as an attacking midfielder or on the wing
 Federico Zenuni  –  Albanian professional footballer
 Shaqir Tafa  –  Albanian professional footballer
 Ismet Sinani  –  Footballer
 Kleto Gjura  –  Footballer
 Fabio Sakaj  –  Footballer
 Alessio Ruçi  –  Footballer
 Nicola Legrottaglie  –   Italian retired footballer who played as a central defender, and is the current assistant manager at Cagliari Calcio
 Andrea Tripicchio  –     Italian professional footballer
 Angelo Ndrecka  –     Italian-Albanian professional footballer
 Francesco Pianeta  –  Italian professional boxer
 Antonio Giovinazzi  –  Italian racing driver
 Luigi Mastrangelo  –    Italian men's volleyball player
 Andy Parrino  –    American former professional baseball player
 Noel Borshi  –  Albanian swimmer
 Ornel Gega  –  Rugby union player
 Engjel Makelara  –  Rugby union player
 Luca Shytaj  –  Albanian-Italian chess grandmaster and virologist
 Klodeta Gjini  –  Albanian track and field athlete
 Abramo Canka  –  Italian professional basketball player

Writers 
 Irma Kurti

References

Italy